Vinyl norbornene (VNB) is an organic compound that consists of a vinyl group attached to norbornene.  It is a colorless liquid. The compound exists as endo and exo isomers, but these are not typically separated. It is an intermediate in the production of the commercial polymer EPDM.  It is prepared by the Diels-Alder reaction of butadiene and cyclopentadiene.

Safety
 (intravenous, rabbit = 0.10–0.05 mg/kg(female).  It is also a neurotoxin.

References

Cyclopentenes